Matthew Walker is a New Zealand–born Australian-trained actor and performer.

Background 
Walker was born on 11 May 1979 in Hamilton, New Zealand.

Walker trained at the prestigious National Institute of Dramatic Art NIDA, Australia's leading drama school, boasting graduates such as Cate Blanchette, Toni Collette and Sam Worthington. He was accepted into NIDA in 2002, after auditioning alongside over 4000 other people for the 20 places in the schools acting course. He graduated in 2004.

Walker also completed a business and arts degree at Victoria University of Wellington, majoring in marketing, and theatre and film.

Television roles 

Walker currently plays Dr. Karl Vanderbeck in New Zealand's popular prime time drama series Shortland Street.

Walker played the leading role of Adam Martini in Danish / New Zealand co-production Straight Forward. Described as an international crime caper the big budget 8 part series is currently filming in Auckland, Queenstown and Copenhagen.

Walker appeared in the TVNZ drama "Dirty Laundry" as bad guy Nikki Rossini, and played a recurring character, Ford Hathaway, in the second season of TVNZ's "Filthy Rich". He also played Vince Cully, a recurring character in the final season of Australian Channel 7 series 800 Words.

Other television and film credits include Chinese war epic The Children of Huang Shi appearing alongside Jonathan Rhys-Meyers. "Rake" and The Cut for the ABC (playing identical twins in "The Cut"), and "Legend of the Seeker" for Disney.

Walker is well known for his role as Justin Jefferies, the elder brother of Aden Jefferies in the popular channel 7 soap Home and Away.

Filmography (incomplete)

Television

Stage 
He has appeared on-stage at the Sydney Opera House with the Bell Shakespeare Company, and with Griffin Theatre Company in the world premiere of Colder, and the Australasian premiere of Tracey Letts "Bug". He played Lysander in A Midsummer Night's Dream by Mendelssohn with the Sydney Symphony Orchestra under Vladimir Ashkenazy.

References

External links 
 

1979 births
Australian male film actors
Australian male television actors
Living people
New Zealand male film actors
New Zealand male television actors
People from Hamilton, New Zealand
Victoria University of Wellington alumni